The Pitampura metro station is located on the Red Line of the Delhi Metro, catering to the Pitampura area of Delhi.

Station layout

See also
List of Delhi Metro stations
Transport in Delhi

References

External links

 Delhi Metro Rail Corporation Ltd. (Official site)

Delhi Metro stations
Railway stations opened in 2004
Railway stations in North West Delhi district